Christian Lykke Graugaard (born 1967) is a Danish medical doctor, author, poet, and professor of sexology at the Aalborg University. He has published widely about sexology, both in popular and scientific contexts, and has published a number of collections of his own poetry as well as translations of works by Nordic poets. He has also been a regular contributor to the debate section in the newspaper Politiken. Furthermore, in his role as director of the organization Sex & Samfund (Sex & Society), he is a frequent commentator on issues related to human sexuality in the Danish public debate. He is a critic of the practice of circumcision of boys, arguing that it should only be a legal procedure for boys above the age of 15, the Danish age of sexual consent.

Publications
 Kan jeg købe dine øjnes blå dans (digte) 1986
 Falske rum (digte) 1987
 Febertræer (digte) 1988
 Hjerne og seksualitet – aspekter af teori og klinik 1997
 Ung og sårbar 2000
 Sexleksikon – fra abe til Aarestrup 2001
 Lir – slang om sex 2002
 Krop, sygdom & seksualitet 2006
 Kend din krop, mand 2006
 Corpus – rejser i menneskekroppen 2008
 Kun for drenge – værd at vide om krop, følelser og sex 2010

Translations:
 Werner Aspenström: Sardinen i tunnelbanen – digte 1946-97 2004
 Rolf Jacobsen: Fluen i teleskopet – digte 1933-85 2007
 Elmer Diktonius: På toppen af et øjeblik – digte 1921-54 2011

References

External links
Faculty Profile at the University of Aalborg

1967 births
Living people
Danish medical researchers
Danish sexologists
Danish male poets
Academic staff of Aalborg University